Rhamphina is a genus of bristle flies in the family Tachinidae.

Species
Rhamphina pedemontana (Meigen, 1824)
Rhamphina rectirostris Herting, 1971

References

Diptera of Europe
Dexiinae
Tachinidae genera
Taxa named by Pierre-Justin-Marie Macquart